Allium nathaliae is a species of wild onion endemic to the Crimean Peninsula.

References

nathaliae
Onions
Flora of the Crimean Peninsula
Plants described in 2004